Geoffroy Mathieu (born 1 June 1997) is a French swimmer. He competed in the men's 100 metre backstroke event at the 2017 World Aquatics Championships.

References

External links
 

1997 births
Living people
French male backstroke swimmers
Swimmers at the 2014 Summer Youth Olympics
Swimmers at the 2018 Mediterranean Games
Mediterranean Games competitors for France
20th-century French people
21st-century French people